Stephen Garland Lester (18 March 1906 – 24 October 1971) was a New Zealand cricketer who played first-class cricket for Canterbury from 1929 to 1936.

Career
A right-handed middle-order batsman and medium-pace bowler, Lester was a regular member of the Canterbury team in the early 1930s. His highest score came in his second match, when he scored 12 and 64 and took 2 for 45 and 3 for 56 against Wellington in the Plunket Shield. His best bowling figures came a year later against Auckland, when in Canterbury's four-wicket victory he took 4 for 21 and 2 for 73 and made 35. When there was speculation about the possible addition of a 15th player to the New Zealand team to tour England in 1931, Lester was one of the players in contention; however, only 14 toured. A year later he was twelfth man for New Zealand in the First Test against South Africa in 1931-32, played in Christchurch.

During the Second World War Lester served in New Zealand in the Royal New Zealand Air Force, first as a flying officer, then as a squadron leader and commanding officer of the Christchurch Wing. He was a member of the New Zealand Cricket Council.

The Stephen Lester Memorial Trophy is awarded annually to the bowler taking the most wickets in the Christchurch men's premiership competition.

Personal life
Lester worked as a stock and station agent. In March 1932 he married Eleanor West-Watson, whose father was the Anglican Bishop of Christchurch. They had two sons and a daughter.

References

External links
 

1906 births
1971 deaths
People educated at Christ's College, Christchurch
New Zealand cricketers
Canterbury cricketers
People from Amberley, New Zealand
New Zealand military personnel of World War II
Cricketers from Canterbury, New Zealand